Fengze or Feng Ze can refer to:

 Fengze District of the city of Quanzhou in China
 Kenny Khoo, singer whose Chinese name is Qiu Fengze